The Muskegon Lassies were one of the expansion teams of the All-American Girls Professional Baseball League in the 1946 season, representing Muskegon, Michigan. The team played their home games at Marsh Field.

History
The 1946 Muskegon Lassies posted a 46–66 record in their first year, and placed sixth in the eight–team league. They improved to 69–43 in 1947, to win a close pennant race with the Grand Rapids Chicks. Muskegon was led by OF/P Doris Sams, who ranked in several offensive categories and also collected 11 victories, including a perfect game, good enough to win the Most Valuable Player Award. Notably, the team counted with three of the top four pitchers in earned run average, Sams (0.98), Amy Irene Applegren (1.06) and Nancy Warren (1.13), but lost to the Racine Belles in the best-of-five, first-round matchup 3–1.

Muskegon went 66–57 in 1948 to gain a playoff berth, but lost to the Fort Wayne Daisies in the first round, three to zero games.

The team dropped to 46–66 in 1949 but was able to reach the playoffs for the third consecutive year. Muskegon disposed of the Kenosha Comets in the first round, 3–1, being swept by the South Bend Blue Sox in the semifinals, 3–0.

1950 became a nightmare for Muskegon, after registering the worst record in the league (36–73) and a relocation during the midseason to Kalamazoo, Michigan, where the team was renamed the Kalamazoo Lassies.

All-time roster
Bold denotes members of the inaugural roster

Gertrude Alderfer
Beatrice Allard
Melba Alspaugh
Amy Applegren
Norene Arnold
Doris Barr
Patricia Barringer
Erma Bergmann
Jaynne Bittner
Shirley Burkovich
Phyllis Carlson
Ann Cindric
Donna Cook
Gloria Cordes
Gladys Davis
Betty Degner
Pauline Dennert
Peggy Fenton
Alva Jo Fischer
Anita Foss 
Betty Francis
Genevieve George
Julie Gutz
Miss Hack
Helen Hannah
Josephine Hasham
Alice Hohlmayer
Margaret Holgerson
Anna Mae Hutchison
Arleene Johnson
Marilyn Jones
Glenna Sue Kidd
Theresa Klosowski
Arlene Kotil
Marie Kruckel
Josephine Lenard
Sarah Lonetto
Therese McKinley
Dorothy Maguire
Pauline Martin
Naomi Meier
Norma Metrolis
Dorothy Montgomery
Eve Mytrysak
Eileen O'Brien
Joanne Overleese
Barbara Payne
Marguerite Pearson
Betty Petryna
Charlene Pryer
Sara Reeser
Mary Rini
Juanita Roylance
Doris Sams
June Schofield
Delores Seigfried
Dorothy Stolze
Doris Tetzlaff
Kathryn Vonderau
Betty Wagoner
Helen Walulik
Nancy Warren
Marion Watson
Evelyn Wawryshyn
Marie Wegman
Margaret Wenzell
Elizabeth Wicken
Renae Youngberg

Managers

Sources
The All-American Girls Professional Baseball League Record Book – W. C. Madden. Publisher: McFarland & Company, 2000. Format: Hardcover, 302pp. Language: English. 
Encyclopedia of Women and Baseball' – Leslie A. Heaphy, Mel Anthony May. Publisher: McFarland & Company, 2006. Format: Paperback, 438pp. Language: English.

External links
 Muskegon Area Sports Hall of Fame

All-American Girls Professional Baseball League teams
1946 establishments in Michigan
1950 disestablishments in Michigan
Baseball teams established in 1946
Baseball teams disestablished in 1950
Sports in Muskegon, Michigan
Defunct baseball teams in Michigan
Women's sports in Michigan